Many Christians have followed certain dress codes during attendance at church. Customs have varied over time and among different Christian denominations. As with the Bible, the Church Fathers of Christianity taught modesty as a core principle guiding the clothing that Christians are to manufacture and wear.

Clothing worn during religious services

In some Christian communities, the term "Sunday best" refers to the tradition of saving one's finest clothing for Sunday services. In some communities, churches served as the main social center for local residents. As such, dressing in fine clothing for religious services was often dictated by a need to project status and influence among peers. Many Christians reject this practice and instead encourage modest, respectful dress not only for Sunday worship, but in everyday life (cf. outward holiness). In , Adam and Eve tried to cover their nakedness, though their attempt was inadequate for God; this, according to Holiness Methodist theology, reflects the tendency in humans to "invent inadequate coverings for our nakedness."  and  teach that Jehovah properly clothed humans and that a "fully-clothed person is a God-ordained symbol of the full clothing of Christ's righteousness."  and  teach that nakedness is inclusive of anything that includes the torso and thighs; as such Christians of the Holiness Methodist tradition wear pants or dresses that go beyond the knees, as well as shirts that do not expose the underarms. 

Indeed, in the early Christian manual Paedagogus, the injunction for clothing to extend past the knees was enjoined. With the adjective kosmios (κόσμιος) meaning "modest",  uses the Greek word catastola katastolé (καταστολῇ) for the apparel suitable for Christian females, and for this reason, women belonging to Conservative Anabaptist denominations often wear a cape dress with a headcovering; for example, ladies who are members of the Charity Christian Fellowship wear the cape dress with an opaque hanging veil as the denomination teaches that "the sisters are to wear a double layered garment as the Greek word 'catastola' describes."

Many Christian traditions encourage or require adherents to don clothing of religious significance during church services (and in the public), such as a headcovering, a practice enjoined by Paul in the Bible. As such, the wearing of headcoverings by women, continually, is enjoined in Anabaptist Christian denominations, as well while attending services in some Reformed, Plymouth Brethren, Oriental Orthodox and Eastern Orthodox communities. Some Catholic, Lutheran, Anglican, Methodist and non-denominational Christian women also choose to cover their heads for worship. Some Christian holy days incorporate traditional clothing, such as the Easter bonnet. Christians' clothing has, however, evolved over time.

In recent decades, some churches have encouraged a more informal dress code. Among the first to adopt this policy were the Calvary Chapel associated churches. Many clergy members, especially those in denominations and religious groups formed in the 20th century, have abandoned the traditional robes and vestments in favor of business casual clothing. This change was made to close the perceived gap between the clergy and laypersons. Some even wear jeans and other everyday casual wear if the members have chosen to dress casual as well. Though a small minority, Christian naturists take this one step further, and wear no clothing at all, which they see as "God's design".

See also
 Religious clothing – including further information on Christian religious clothing

References

External links
 Clothing - Early Christian Commentary
 Clothing of the early Christians and Arabians of the Middle East 
 "A Business of the Cloth Finds a Surge in Demand" by Debra Nussbaum, "The New York Times", January 28, 1996, retrieved September 6, 2009.
 "What Would Jesus Sell?" by Stephanie Simon, "The Los Angeles Times", July 21, 2006, retrieved January 4, 2010.